Lee Barron (born 15 February 2001) is an Irish rugby union player, currently playing for United Rugby Championship and European Rugby Champions Cup side Leinster. His preferred position is hooker.

Leinster
Barron was named in the Leinster Rugby academy for the 2021–22 season.

References

External links
itsrugby.co.uk Profile

2001 births
Living people
People educated at St Michael's College, Dublin
Irish rugby union players
Leinster Rugby players
Rugby union hookers
Rugby union players from Dublin (city)